The Woodland Shale is a geologic formation in Jamaica. It preserves fossils dating back to the Cretaceous period.

See also

 List of fossiliferous stratigraphic units in Jamaica

References
 

Cretaceous Jamaica
Shale formations
Geologic formations of the Caribbean
Cretaceous Caribbean